Major-General Robert Valentine Pollok CB CBE DSO (1884–1979) was an Irish-born British Army officer who became General Officer Commanding Northern Ireland District.

Military career
After attending Eton and the Royal Military College, Sandhurst, Pollok was commissioned into the 15th Hussars in 1903. He was appointed Aide-de-Camp to the Lieutenant Governor of United Provinces in India in 1908 and Aide-de-Camp to the Governor General and Commander-in-Chief of Australia in 1913.

He served in World War I with the Australian Forces in Gallipoli and then transferred to the Irish Guards in 1916. He became Commanding Officer of 1st Bn Irish Guards in 1917.

After the War he attended the Staff College, Camberley from 1920–1921, was appointed Brigade Major for the 1st Guards Brigade at Aldershot Command and then, in 1926, he was re-appointed Commanding Officer of 1st Bn Irish Guards. He was made Commander of the 1st Guards Brigade at Aldershot Command in 1931 and Commandant of the Senior Officer School at Sheerness in 1935.

He was appointed General Officer Commanding Northern Ireland District in 1938 and GOC 43rd (Wessex) Infantry Division in July 1940. He was appointed a Companion of the Order of the Bath in July 1940 and retired in 1941.

References

Bibliography

External links
Generals of World War II

|-

|-

1884 births
1979 deaths
Military personnel from County Galway
British Army major generals
15th The King's Hussars officers
Irish Guards officers
British Army generals of World War II
British Army personnel of World War I
Commanders of the Order of the British Empire
Companions of the Distinguished Service Order
Companions of the Order of the Bath
Irish aviators
Graduates of the Royal Military College, Sandhurst
Graduates of the Staff College, Camberley
Commandants of the Senior Officers' School, Sheerness
People from County Galway
People from Ballinasloe